Collective responsibility, also known as collective guilt, refers to responsibilities of organizations, groups and societies. Collective responsibility in the form of collective punishment is often used as a disciplinary measure in closed institutions, e.g. boarding schools (punishing a whole class for the actions of one known or unknown pupil), military units, prisons (juvenile and adult), psychiatric facilities, etc. The effectiveness and severity of this measure may vary greatly, but it often breeds distrust and isolation among their members. Historically, collective punishment is a sign of authoritarian tendencies in the institution or its home society.

In ethics, both methodological individualists and normative individualists question the validity of collective responsibility. Normally, only the individual actor can accrue culpability for actions that they freely cause. The notion of collective culpability seems to deny individual moral responsibility. Contemporary systems of criminal law accept the principle that guilt shall only be personal. According to genocide scholar A. Dirk Moses, "The collective guilt accusation is unacceptable in scholarship, let alone in normal discourse and is, I think, one of the key ingredients in genocidal thinking."

In business

As the business practices known as corporate social responsibility (CSR) and sustainability mature and converge with the responsibilities of governments and citizens, the term "collective responsibility" is beginning to be more widely used.

Collective responsibility is widely applied in corporations, where the entire workforce is held responsible for failure to achieve corporate targets (for example, profit targets), irrespective of the performance of individuals or teams which may have achieved or overachieved within their area. Collective punishment, even including measures that actually further harm the prospect of achieving targets, is applied as a measure to 'teach' the workforce.

In culture
The concept of collective responsibility is present in literature, most notably in Samuel Taylor Coleridge's "The Rime of the Ancient Mariner", a poem telling the tale of a ship's crew who died of thirst after they approved of one crew member's killing of an albatross.

1959's Ben-Hur and 1983's prison crime drama Bad Boys depict collective responsibility and punishment.
The play 'An Inspector Calls' by J.B Priestley also features the theme of collective responsibility throughout the investigation process.

In politics 

In some countries with parliamentary systems, there is a convention that all members of a cabinet must publicly support all government decisions, even if they do not agree with them. Members of the cabinet that wish to dissent or object publicly must resign from their positions or be sacked.

As a result of collective responsibility, the entire government cabinet must resign if a vote of no confidence is passed in parliament.

In law 

Where two or more persons are liable in respect of the same obligation, the extent of their joint liability varies among jurisdictions.

In religion

Jews recognize two kinds of sin, offenses against other people, and offenses against God. An offense against God may be understood as a violation of a contract (the Covenant between God and the Children of Israel). Ezra, a priest and a scribe, was the leader of a large group of exiles. On his return to Jerusalem, where he was required to teach the Jews to obey the laws of God, he discovered that the Jews had been marrying non-Jews. He tore his garments in despair and confessed the sins of Israel before God, before he went on to purify the community. The Book of Jeremiah (Yirmiyahu [ירמיהו]) can be organized into five sub-sections. One part, Jeremiah 2-24, displays scorn for the sins of Israel. The poem in 2:1–3:5 shows the evidence of a broken covenant against Israel.

This concept is found in the Old Testament (or the Tanakh), some examples of it are the account of the Flood, the Tower of Babel, Sodom and Gomorrah and in some interpretations, the Book of Joshua's Achan. In those records, entire communities were punished for the actions of the vast majority of their members, however, it is impossible to state that there were no innocent people, nor is it possible to state that there were children who were too young to be responsible for their deeds, so they were also punished.

The practice of blaming the Jews for Jesus' death is the longest-lasting example of collective responsibility.  In this case, the blame was not only cast upon the Jews of Jesus's time, it was also cast upon successive generations of Jews. This practice is documented in Matthew 27:25-66 New International Version (NIV) 25: "All the people answered, 'His blood is on us and on our children!

Collective punishment 

Collective responsibility in the form of collective punishment is often used as a disciplinary measure in closed institutions, e.g. boarding schools (punishing a whole class for the actions of one known or unknown pupil), military units, prisons (juvenile and adult), psychiatric facilities, etc. The effectiveness and severity of this measure may vary greatly, but it often breeds distrust and isolation among their members. Historically, collective punishment is a sign of authoritarian and/or totalitarian tendencies in the institution and/or its home society. For example, in the Soviet Gulags, all members of a brigada (work unit) were punished for bad performance of any of its members.

Collective punishment is also practiced in the situation of war, economic sanctions, etc., presupposing the existence of collective guilt. Collective guilt, or guilt by association, is the controversial collectivist idea that individuals who are identified as a member of a certain group carry the responsibility for an act or behavior that members of that group have demonstrated, even if they themselves were not involved. Contemporary systems of criminal law accept the principle that guilt shall only be personal.

During the occupation of Poland by Nazi Germany, the Germans applied collective responsibility: any kind of help which was given to a person of Jewish faith or origin was punished with death, and not only the rescuer, but his/her family was also executed. This was widely publicized by the Germans. During the occupation, for every German killed by a Pole, 100-400 Poles were shot in retribution. Communities were held collectively responsible for the purported Polish counter-attacks against the invading German troops. Mass executions of łapanka hostages were conducted every single day during the Wehrmacht advance across Poland in September 1939 and thereafter.

Another example of collective punishment was applied after the war, when ethnic Germans in Central and Eastern Europe were collectively blamed for Nazi crimes, resulting in the commition of numerous atrocities against the German population, including killings (see Expulsion of Germans after World War II and Beneš decrees).

Perception
Entitativity is the perception of groups as being entities in themselves (an entitative group), independent of any of the group's members.

Ethics
In ethics, both methodological individualists and normative individualists question the validity of collective responsibility.

Methodological individualists challenge the very possibility of associating moral agency with groups, as distinct from their individual members, and normative individualists argue that collective responsibility violates principles of both individual responsibility and fairness. (Stanford Encyclopedia of Philosophy) 

Normally, only the individual actor can accrue culpability for actions that they freely cause. The notion of collective culpability seems to deny individual moral responsibility. Does collective responsibility make sense? History is filled with examples of a wronged man who tried to avenge himself, not only on the person who has wronged him, but on other members of the wrongdoer's family, tribe, ethnic group, religion, or nation.

According to genocide scholar A. Dirk Moses, "The collective guilt accusation is unacceptable in scholarship, let alone in normal discourse and is, I think, one of the key ingredients in genocidal thinking."

See also

References

Works cited

Further reading

External links

 
 

Collective punishment
Social privilege
Social influence
Political theories
Religious belief and doctrine
Applied ethics